Currituck Banks North Carolina National Estuarine Research Reserve is a component site of the North Carolina National Estuarine Research Reserve on the Currituck Banks, north of Corolla, North Carolina. Currituck Banks is one of three original National Estuarine Research Reserve sites dedicated by NOAA in 1985. The reserve encompasses 965 acres of varied habitat and is bordered by the Currituck Sound. The Currituck banks are a part of a 70 mile long barrier spit that extends from Virginia Beach to Oregon Inlet.

Description 
The reserve is an example of a low-salinity estuarine ecosystem, and contains a variety of habitats, including beach, sand dunes, grasslands, shrub thicket, maritime forest, brackish and freshwater marshes, tidal flats, and subtidal soft bottoms.

The reserve was described in the Boston Globe as being among the coast's most beautiful nature preserves; the review noted that the reserve and surrounding area is nearly empty of people during the off-season.

Fauna 
The reserve is home to a wealth of birds and fish, including commercial and game fish species. The reserve allows hunting (with a registration form required), and is also listed as an eBird hotspot for birdwatching. Mammals include white-tailed deer, eastern gray squirrel, cottontail and marsh rabbit, opossum, raccoon, gray fox, bobcat, muskrat, river otter, and the invasive nutria. The uniquely brackish water allows both salt water and freshwater species of fish to thrive here. Saltwater fish species include speckled trout, flounder, red drum, mullet and striped bass. Freshwater fish species include largemouth bass, sunfish, crappie, and perch.

References

External links 
 Currituck Banks North Carolina National Estuarine Research Reserve
 North Carolina Reserve: The Currituck Banks Component

Protected areas of Currituck County, North Carolina
Protected areas of North Carolina
National Estuarine Research Reserves of the United States
Estuaries of North Carolina
Landforms of Currituck County, North Carolina
Wetlands of North Carolina